Mercedes-Benz has sold a number of automobiles with the "420" model name:
 1994–1995 W124
 1994–1995 E420
 1986–1991 W126
 1986–1991 420SEL
 1994-1999 W140
 1994-1999 S420
 1997 W210
 1997 E420
2006-2009 Mercedes-Benz W221 S420 CDI

420